Dendropsophus subocularis is a species of frog in the family Hylidae. It is found in eastern Panama and northwestern Colombia to the Magdalena River Valley.

Description
The dorsum is yellowish-tan with some darker brown pigmentation or other markings, sometimes forming a faint "X" just behind the head. There is usually dark barring on the upper surfaces of the arms and legs. The ventrum is creamy white. The webbing of the feet is more extensive than that of the hands. Digits bear large terminal discs.

The eggs are bright yellow. The tadpoles are mostly black.

Habitat and conservation
The species' natural habitats are humid lowland forests. It tolerates some habitat modification. It is an arboreal species that breeds in temporary and permanent pools. The eggs are laid on vegetation overhanging water. The species is threatened by habitat loss (deforestation).

References

subocularis
Amphibians of Colombia
Amphibians of Panama
Amphibians described in 1934
Taxa named by Emmett Reid Dunn
Taxonomy articles created by Polbot